The Victoria Institution is the oldest secondary school in Kuala Lumpur, Malaysia. It is a memorial school, so-called because it was partly funded by public subscription intended for the erection of a permanent memorial to commemorate the Golden Jubilee of Queen Victoria in 1887. The establishment of the school was further supported by financial contributions from the Sultan and government of Selangor, prominent Kuala Lumpur residents, and the general public.

The school reverted to its original name (instead of SMK Victoria) in February 2009, after being granted approval in recognition of its having been declared part of Malaysia's national heritage.

The Victoria Institution is a secondary school for male students only from Form 1 to 5. Female students are accepted for Form 6 (Lower and Upper). The school is widely known as VI, and a student of the Victoria Institution is known as a Victorian.

Performing well both academically and in sports, the VI is considered one of the best non-residential schools in Malaysia. In 2007, VI was named as a Cluster School of Excellence by the then Minister of Malaysian Ministry of Education, Hishamuddin Hussein.

The post-war period 
On 13 September 1945, the school was the site of the formal surrender of the 29th Imperial Japanese Army to Lieutenant-General Ouvry Roberts of the 34th Indian Corps.

School buildings

The former building (1893–1929)

Foundation stone and early years 
The school's foundation stone was laid by on 14 August 1893 by Lady Treacher, who was the wife of Selangor Resident at that time; Sir William Hood Treacher. The school was opened on 28 July 1894. This original school building is located at Jalan Tun H.S. Lee, right next to the site of present-day  Pasar Seni LRT/MRT station.

Status of former building after the completion of new building 
This building was then used as a premise of the Technical College (now Universiti Teknologi Malaysia) up until the 1950s when the new Technical College building at Jalan Gurney (now Jalan Semarak) was completed and officially opened on the 1 March 1955 by Sir Donald MacGillivray, the then British High Commissioner to Malaya.

After the Technical College had moved out, the old VI building was used as a school again, as High Street School, which in turn moved to Setapak and became known as Setapak High School.

The old VI building was then managed around the 1980s by the Kuala Lumpur City Hall as a cultural centre,  known as Taman Budaya, until it was burnt down by a fire in 1999. Restoration work was made from 2002 to 2005 by JTK Consult. The department is now run as the National Department For Culture & Arts.

The current building (1929–present)
As the VI's former location was frequently flooded by the nearby Klang River during heavy downpours, the Victoria Institution moved to Jalan Hang Tuah (formerly known as Shaw Road) on 26 March 1929.
The Victoria Institution has a clock tower overlooking two sports pavilions at its façade, and a large field, surrounded by colonial-era trees (yellow flame trees and palms). The VI also has its own 25-metre swimming pool and synthetic track for 100 metres sprint events, making it the only school in the region with these facilities at that time.

Student life 
It is a rule that all freshman students are required to join at least one uniform body, take on an active role in one of the school's 50 clubs, and participate in at least one sport. Some students are also in the school’s hostel. Hence, the school's students aren't limited to Kuala Lumpur residents only, but also kids who are from other states. Because the school is in the centre of Kuala Lumpur, most students also hang out at the mall after school ends. Transport is easy too because a Mass Rapid Transit (Malaysia) station, Merdeka, is located right in front of the school's gate. Students also may wear Baju Melayu with the school's special Samping (made for students and which can be bought at the schools' minimart) on Fridays to go to the Friday prayer after school at Al-Bukhari Foundation Mosque located next to the school.

Traditions and heritage 
The prefect disciplinary system is very much similar to the traditions first laid out by the school's second headmaster, Major Richard Sidney (VI First Prefects).

Detention classes and community service are still the common penalties for misdemeanours in the VI, while such traditions are no longer in practice in many Malaysian schools.

The VI is also home to the oldest cadet corps in the country, the Victoria Institution Cadet Corps (affiliated with the Malaysian Army and the first to receive Colours in 1960 in honor of the role played in the Second World War), the oldest cadet corps band in the country, the Victoria Institution Cadet Corps Band, and the oldest scout group in the country, the First Kuala Lumpur Scout Troop. The First Kuala Lumpur Scout Troop split into two troops in 1933 thus establishing the First Kuala Lumpur Scout Troop and the Second Kuala Lumpur Scout Troop. The official name of the Second Kuala Lumpur Scout Troop today is the Victoria Scout Group.

The VI has annual events such as the Military Tattoo (performance by marching bands and cadets), Scouts' Campfire (rescue act by senior scouts), Annual Sports Carnival, Speech Days, and Science Fairs. The Victoria Institution is the only school in Malaysia that has its own Edinburgh-styled Military Tattoo.

VI had a daily event for students every day before COVID-19 hit, it was known to students as ‘Lines’ where the school’s prefects would shout “LINES!” that would be audible throughout the whole school to check the student's attire to make sure they were perfect. If a student doesn't have complete attire (the school's pin badge, a name tag, or a tie) the student must go to the Prefect Room 30 minutes before ‘Lines’ start to get an ‘Excuse Slip’ so they won't be called to the ‘Back’ of the line. ‘Lines’ start every day at 7:20 am before school starts and at 10:20 am after recess. Each session would be 20 minutes. If a group of students behaved badly, they will be called to the Prefects Room to receive punishment either detention or a warning.

The school also has its own school magazine and school newspaper. The magazine, The Victorian, is published annually for the benefit of the students. The school newspaper, The Seladang (the name derived from the seladang head in the school crest), was first published in 1953 and ceased publication circa 2016.

Sports 
The VI participates in the Bangsar zone at district level and in the MSSKL (Kuala Lumpur School Sports Council) tournament at the state level. Among the sports that the VI participates in are football, rugby union, cricket, basketball, waterpolo, badminton, archery, Hockey, handball, volleyball, athletics, tennis and table-tennis. VI is the defending champion in football and waterpolo at the state level.

The VI meets the MCKK in football for the Sultan Azlan Shah Cup every year with the venue alternating each year between the two schools. Because of its strong tradition in sports, the VI has produced many Malaysian sportsmen including Mokhtar Dahari, Misbun Sidek, Rashid Sidek, Shahrin Majid, Razif Sidek, Jalani Sidek, Rahman Sidek, Foo Kok Keong, Dr Samani Abdul Ghani and Tan Sri Dr Mani Jegathesan.

The school's cricket ground first witnessed an international match when Ireland played Gibraltar in the 1997 ICC Trophy, which was hosted by Malaysia. Eight matches in that competition were played at the school premises. The ground also played host to three List A fixtures played in the cricket competition at the 1998 Commonwealth Games. These fixtures saw Pakistan play Scotland, Canada played India, and Malaysia play Jamaica.

Motto 

Be Yet Wiser; To be a Scholar, Sportsman and a Gentleman

Strictly, the school has no official motto at all. The first motto is actually that of the school newspaper, "The Seladang", founded in October 1953. It was selected by the first editor, R. Nithiahnanthan, and displayed on its front-page banner under the head of the seladang taken from the school crest. Over time the motto seems to have been hijacked as that of the school. The motto is derived from the Biblical proverb, "Give instruction to a wise man and he will be yet wiser."

"To be a scholar, sportsman and a gentleman" was actually quoted from an interview, in the late 1960s, in the school magazine "The Victorian", with the then headmaster, Mr V. Murugasu, in which the headmaster expressed his belief in what all Victorians should aspire to be.

Over time these two aphorisms seem to have been accepted as school mottos, although there have been no official declarations as such.

Houses 
There are eight sport houses in the VI. The sports houses compete against each other on sports day. The Victoria Institution Sports Day has been held since 1897, and is widely regarded as a citywide event, with huge crowds converging on the Victoria Institution field in the early days. The houses are named after the founders, benefactors and even supporters of the school. Initially there were ten houses, including two which do not exist today—Nugent Walsh House and Steve Harper House. After the school premises were moved to the present Petaling Hill and the VI became a secondary school, there were only five houses—Shaw, Treacher, Yap Kwan Seng, Hepponstall and Thamboosamy—because of the fewer number of students. However, after the war, with increased demand for education, three new houses were added—Rodger, Davidson and Loke Yew—making the total eight. The present houses are:
 Thamboosamy, green
 Lee Kuan Yew (formerly known as Hepponstall, named after the first acting Headmaster of VI), yellow
 Sultan Abdul Samad (formerly known as Davidson, named after the Infant School supervisor, Elizabeth Davidson), purple
 Rodger, orange
 Loke Yew, brown
 Shaw, red
 Yap Kwan Seng, light blue
 Treacher, dark blue

Rivalry 
The VI has its rivals, both in Kuala Lumpur and nationally. St. John's Institution and MBSSKL are the VI's traditional regional archrivals for the past 101 years. This rivalry can be observed during sports tournaments between these three schools. Nationally, the VI also enjoys a rivalry with two elite institutions—the Royal Military College, Kuala Lumpur and the Malay College Kuala Kangsar. The rivalry with the former is apparent in football and rugby MSSKL state-level tournaments and the rivalry with the latter is evident in the Sultan Azlan Shah Cup, a football playoff between the premier schools of Kuala Lumpur and Kuala Kangsar, Perak.

Alumni Association 
The Alumni Association of the VI is known as the VIOBA (Victoria Institution Old Boys' Association) and was founded in 1922. The games competition between the Current Victorians and the Old Boys is for the Daniel Shield and this tournament is held every year. There is a similar Alumni Association in Singapore, the VIOBA Singapore.

Notable alumni
 Sultan Hassanal Bolkiah, Sultan Of Brunei
 Ismail Mohd Ali, first Governor of Bank Negara Malaysia
 Ananda Krishnan, businessman and Malaysia's 2nd richest man
 Francis Yeoh, Managing Director of YTL Corporation
 Syed Amin Aljeffri, Malaysian entrepreneur
 Mohamed Hashim bin Mohd Ali, General (Rtd), 9th Commander, Chief of Defence Forces
 Raja Petra Kamarudin, political activist, founder of the Malaysia Today website
 S. Rajaratnam, former Deputy Prime Minister of Singapore
 S. Namasivayam, Singaporean artist
 Rafidah Aziz, former International Trade and Industry Minister Malaysia
 Zulhasnan Rafique, former Federal Territories Minister Malaysia
 Ruben Gnanalingam, CEO Westports Malaysia
 Wong Phui Nam, Poet
 Wan Zaleha Radzi, ex-TV newscaster, celebrity, Asian Games (1998) and South-East Asian Games (1995) medallist for Equestrian
 Kamahl cabaret/easy listening Australian singer and recording artist, famous for The Elephant Song
 Raja Nong Chik, Federal Territory Minister
 Ramon Navaratnam, Malaysian economist
 T. Sachithanandan, pioneering Malaysian anesthesiologist
 Paul Tan, automotive journalist
 Shafie Apdal,  Minister for Domestic Trade & Consumer Affairs; Minister for Unity, Culture, Arts and National Heritage; Minister for Rural and Regional Development; VP, UMNO; Founder of WARISAN; MP for Semporna; Chief Minister and Finance Minister of Sabah, ADUN for Senallang
 Tommy Thomas, Lawyer, 8th Attorney General of Malaysia .
 Mahadev Shankar, lawyer and former Court of Appeal Judge
 Gengadharan Nair, High Court Judge
 Ridzwan Bakar, cardiologist, former CEO & Chairman Pantai Holdings.
 Jit Murad,  Comedian, Writer, Producer, Theater & TV performer, Co-founder of Instant Cafe Theatre
 Amir Muhammad (director), writer and filmmaker
 Sivarasa Rasiah, human rights lawyer and vice-president of the opposition Parti Keadilan Rakyat (People's Justice Party)
 Omar Yoke Lin Ong, politician and member of the first Malayan Cabinet, the fifth President of the Dewan Negara.
 Tan Kee Kwong, politician and former member of parliament for Wangsa Maju.
 Prabowo Subianto Djojohadikusomo, Lt-Gen, Indonesian Armed Forces (R), Defence Minister, Indonesia
 Sri Ramachandran s/o Gopal Iyer [Gopal Sri Ram], Judge, Federal Court of Appeal, Prosecutor
 Chew Wing Foong, former president of the Library Association of Malaysia and former Chairman of CONSAL
 Aidit Alfian, songwriter/producer, winner of TV3's 17th Juara Lagu 2002, Keliru
 Mohd Zaman Khan, former Director of Police CID & former Director General of Malaysian Prison

Sports 
 Mokhtar Dahari, former Malaysian Football International
 Mani Jegathesan, sports icon, doctor, and researcher and deputy president of Olympic Council of Malaysia.
 Misbun Sidek, National Badminton Champion and National Badminton Singles Coach
 Jalani Sidek, All England Badminton Doubles Champions and National Doubles Champions
 Razif Sidek, All England Badminton Doubles Champions and National Doubles Champions
 Rashid Sidek, National Badminton Champion
 K. Reuben, Malaysian footballer
 Shafiq Sharif, Malaysian National team cricketer
 Foo Kok Keong, National Badminton Player, former world number 1
 Soo Beng Khiang, member, 1992 victorious Malaysian Thomas Cup team
 Yeoh Teck Chye, member, 1949 victorious Malayan Thomas Cup team
 Lall Singh, former Indian Test cricketer
 Shahrin Majid, footballer, Malaysian Football International
 Yap Wai Loon, footballer, Malaysian Football International
 Sieh Kok Chi, Malaysian Water Polo player, Secretary-General, Olympic Council of Malaysia
 Hadin Azman, Malaysian footballer, Kuala Lumpur City F.C.
 Mohd Khairi Zainudin, Malaysian footballer
 William Mei York Liang, Championship Racing driver
 Zainon Mat, Captain,  Malaysian Cricket team (1980s)
 Khiew Hoe Yean, Malaysian Swimmer

References 

 Victoria Institution webpage
 Victoria Institution Old Boys' Association
 Victorian personalities
 The Victorian (Annual school magazine)

External links 
 
 The Victoria Institution Web Page

Secondary schools in Malaysia
Educational institutions established in 1893
1893 establishments in British Malaya
Boys' schools in Malaysia
Secondary schools in Kuala Lumpur